St. Michael's Cathedral is a Catholic cathedral located in Keren, Anseba, Eritrea, the seat of the Eritrean Catholic Eparchy of Keren.

The 1875 church rebuilt in 1925 
The first Catholic church in Keren was constructed in the western outskirts of the town in 1865, but was demolished in 1871 by the Egyptian Ethiopian forces who in the 1870s controlled much of Eritrea. The Apostolic Vicariate of Abyssinia, which from 1870 to 1894 had its headquarters in Keren, was allowed to rebuild the church, began the work on 24 May 1873 and completed it and blessed it on 14 February 1875.

Rebuilt in 1925, the church is cruciform with a central dome.

This church became the cathedral of the Eritrean Catholic Eparchy of Keren, when this was set up by Pope John Paul II on 21 December 1995.

Since the beginning, following the practice set by Saint Justin de Jacobis, the liturgy is celebrated in the Ge'ez variant of the  Alexandrian rite.

New cathedral 
In 1965 the foundation stone was laid for a much larger new cathedral of Saint Michael to replace that of 1875/1925. 1961–1991 were the years of the Eritrean War of Independence and only in the 21st century did construction begin in earnest. It was not yet completed in January 2017.

The new building is situated in the south of the town (coordinates: 15.774931 N, 38.448618 E).

With projections for the sanctuary and three entrances, it is octagonal in shape, as in many churches of Ethiopic tradition.

Other churches in Keren 
In the centre of the town of Keren, the Church of Saint Anthony exists, like the cathedral, in two versions, but these two versions are close to each other. The old church was consecrated on 12 June 1932.

The coordinates of the new Church of Saint Anthony are 15.779711 N, 38.454835 E.

See also
Eritrean Catholic Church
Eritrean Catholic Eparchy of Keren

References

Eastern Catholic cathedrals in Eritrea
Keren, Eritrea